Final results for the Judo events at the 2000 Summer Olympics:

Medal table

Medal summary

Men's events

Women's events

Participating nations
A total of 386 Judokas from 89 countries competed in the 2000 Summer Olympics.

References

External links
 
 International Olympic Committee results database
 Videos of the 2000 Judo Summer Olympics

 
O
2000 Summer Olympics events
2000
Judo in Australia
Judo competitions in Australia